The Lexus LF-Gh which stands for "Lexus Future Grand-touring Hybrid" is Lexus's latest LF concept vehicle which debuted at the 2011 New York International Auto Show.  The LF-Gh is a rear wheel drive hybrid platform powered by a Lexus Hybrid Drive powertrain. The LF-Gh also provide a hint of what future Lexus models, mainly the Lexus GS which was scheduled for late 2011, might look like. The front and the back of the LF-Gh is equipped with LED headlights, daytime running lights, and taillights. To improve aerodynamics the LF-Gh's door handles are sealed into the door panel and could be pushed to open out. the large spindle grille on the front of the LF-Gh brings out the aggressiveness of the design.

External links 
Lexus LF-Gh revealed!
toyota Chief Designer on the Lexus LF-Gh concept: ‘The degree of realism is very high’

LF-Gh
Grand tourers
Roadsters
Hardtop convertibles